Rodney Dee Billups (born January 14, 1983) is an American professional basketball coach who is an assistant coach for the Portland Trail Blazers of the National Basketball Association (NBA). He was named head coach at the University of Denver on March 14, 2016, three days after Joe Scott was fired. Billups is the younger brother of former NBA star Chauncey Billups. Billups had been an assistant at Colorado since 2012. He played at the University of Denver from 2002 to 2005. After college, he played professionally with BK Riga of the Latvian Basketball League and Kouvot of the Finnish Korisliiga before turning his attention to coaching. The Colorado 14ers selected Billups in the ninth round of the 2006 NBA Development League Draft.

Billups was the head coach of his alma mater, the University of Denver. He was named head coach on March 14, 2016, three days after Joe Scott was fired.

Head coaching record

References

External links
Denver Pioneers coach bio
Denver Pioneer player bio

1983 births
Living people
American expatriate basketball people in Finland
American expatriate basketball people in Latvia
American men's basketball players
Basketball coaches from Colorado
Basketball players from Denver
College men's basketball head coaches in the United States
Colorado Buffaloes men's basketball coaches
Denver Pioneers men's basketball coaches
Denver Pioneers men's basketball players
Guards (basketball)
Kouvot players
Los Angeles Valley Monarchs men's basketball players
Portland Trail Blazers assistant coaches
Sportspeople from Denver